The Jersey City Independent is a hyperlocal online community news site covering Jersey City and surrounding municipalities in Hudson County, New Jersey. It also publishes JCI Magazine, a quarterly print magazine. The Jersey City Independent and JCI Magazine are owned and operated by Harmony Media NJ, LLC.

Jersey City Independent
Jersey City Independent is a hyperlocal online news site covering community news, events, arts, culture and lifestyle in Jersey City. It was founded in 2008 by Jon Whiten and Shane Smith. In 2014 Harmony Media NJ, LLC purchased the Jersey City Independent. Harmony Media NJ, LLC is a locally owned and operated independent media company. Catherine Hecht is the owner of Harmony Media NJ, LLC and publisher of the Jersey City Independent. Jersey City Independent is a member of the New Jersey Press Association.

JCI Magazine
JCI Magazine is a free quarterly print publication covering arts, culture, and lifestyle in Hudson County. Founded as NEW it was acquired by the Jersey City Independent in December 2009 and had its inaugural issue in April 2010. In 2013, NEW was renamed JCI. JCI Magazine is owned by Harmony Media NJ, LLC. Catherine Hecht is the owner of Harmony Media NJ, LLC and publisher of JCI Magazine.

See also
The Jersey Journal
The Hudson Reporter
River View Observer
Jersey City Magazine
NJ.com

References

External links
 Jersey City Independent
 JCI Magazine

American news websites
Mass media in Hudson County, New Jersey
Jersey City, New Jersey
Magazines published in New Jersey
Magazines established in 2009